The Central Oklahoma Bronchos football team represents the University of Central Oklahoma (UCO) in college football. The team is a member of the Mid-America Intercollegiate Athletics Association (MIAA), which is in Division II of the National Collegiate Athletic Association (NCAA). The UCO Bronchos football program began in 1902 and has since compiled over 600 wins, two national championships, and 26 conference championships.  As of 2011, the Bronchos were ranked third in NCAA Division II for total wins and ranked 12th in winning percentage (0.621). In 1962, the Bronchos went 11–0 on the season and defeated Lenoir–Rhyne University (NC) 28–13 in the Camellia Bowl to claim its first NAIA national championship. Twenty years later, Central Oklahoma defended its home turf and defeated Colorado Mesa University (then Mesa State College) 14–11 in the NAIA national championship game to take its second title and finish the season with a 10–2 record. Despite its rich history in football, Central Oklahoma has struggled beginning in the late 2000s. The program has not participated in the NCAA Division II playoffs since 2003. The Bronchos play their home games at Chad Richison Stadium, a 10,000-seat football stadium built in 1965, and remodeled since 2015. The Bronchos have enjoyed nine undefeated home seasons and are 5–1 in playoff games at Wantland Stadium.

History

Early history (1902–1911)
Five years before Oklahoma became a state, in 1902, UCO played its first game of football. They were shutout in that season's lone contest.  In the match, the Oklahoma A&M Aggies defeated coach-less Central by a score of 40–0.  The Bronchos did not field a team in 1903, but they resumed play the following year in 1904 after securing their first head coach, Lt. Boyd Hill.  Hill stepped down after posting a 2–3 record his first season, and he later went on to coach at Oklahoma A&M during the 1906 season.  In 1905, Coach Fenis Bently took the reins of the young football program and compiled a record of 18–33–4 over the span of seven seasons, with over a third of those losses coming against Oklahoma and Oklahoma A&M.

Wantland era (1912–1930)
After ten years of inconsistent play, the school landed a coach whose name now adorns their stadium in Edmond.  Charles W. Wantland took over as the  head coach in 1912 and guided Central to 106 victories, six conference championships, and Central State's first undefeated season in 1915, during his 18 years at the helm. Central's first conference championship came in 1914, when they posted a 7–1–1 record. In 1922 Wantland's wife suggested the term Bronchos for the school's athletic programs. The third conference championship came in 1923, the Bronchos were impressive that season, beating its opponents by a combined score of 184–25, including a 14–6 victory over Oklahoma A&M in Stillwater.  The Bronchos continued their success by winning their fifth conference championship the following season in which Central defeated the likes of Oklahoma, Baylor (the eventual Southwest Conference Champions), and Tulsa, all on the road.  1924 was the year of the program's sole victory over the Oklahoma Sooners. This is notable because the coaches for both schools, Charles W. Wantland (UCO) and Bennie Owen (OU), were later immortalized for their accomplishments in a nearly identical fashion: UCO named its stadium after Wantland, and OU named its playing field after Owen. In addition to the stadium, UCO memorialized Coach Wantland by naming the physical education building in his honor. Wantland guided UCO to one more conference championship in 1929 and finished the following year with a final record of 106–43–15 (.692).

Reeds era (1931–1940)
Former Oklahoma All-American Claude Reeds left West Texas State and took over the CSTC program in 1931. He picked up right where his predecessor left off by winning eight conference championships in his ten years in charge. In 1940, Reeds ended his tenure at Central State with an impressive record of 57–28–8 (.656).

Hamilton era (1941–1957)
After Reeds' departure, Central State hired Dale E. Hamilton to lead the Bronchos to victory.  Hamilton did not disappoint, posting a 73–25–3 (.738) and winning eight conference championships in his 12-year post. During this time Hamilton spent two tours of duty in the armed forces, and Gene Smith filled in during the Korean War.  After coaching, Hamilton served as the institution's athletic director.  The university's Hamilton Field House is named in his honor.

Blevins era (1958–1963)
Following Hamilton's tough act, Coach Al Blevins managed to take the program to new heights by winning the programs first national championship in 1962. The season prior to their national crown, the Bronchos finished 9–1–0 and won its 20th conference championship. In 1962,  Central State went a perfect 11–0 on the season and defeated Lenoir–Rhyne 28–13 in the Camellia Bowl to take its first of two national championships.

Ball era (1964–1976)
In 1964, Phil Ball replaced Blevins as the Bronchos head coach. After a few rough seasons, including a 3–6–1 record in 1967 the Bronchos rebounded over the next few seasons and won the OCAC championship in 1972, and made the NAIA playoffs. In the final year of Ball's tenure Central State made a transition to the NCAA Division II level. He finished with an overall record of 82–42–6.

Howard era (1977–2002)
In 1977, Gary Howard succeeded Phil Ball as the head coach. He oversaw the program's transition from a brief period in NCAA Division II back to NAIA competition, as an independent. During the first two seasons Howard's Bronchos went 12–8–1. In 1979, he led CSU to the program's third NAIA playoff appearance and an 11–2 record. The Bronchos lost the NAIA National Championship Game to Texas A&I 20–14. Three years later he returned to the playoffs this time winning the NAIA National Championship over Mesa State (now Colorado Mesa) 14–11. Howard also won the NAIA Coach of the Year award. The next season the Bronchos returned to the playoffs but lost to Saginaw Valley State in the first round. In 1985 the Bronchos lost in the first round to Henderson State in the institution's final NAIA playoff appearance.
In 1988 the Bronchos re-joined the NCAA where the joined the Lone Star Conference. The Bronchos struggled for several seasons including a 0–10–1 record in 1989. In 1996 the renamed Central Oklahoma Bronchos posted a 9–3 record, finished second in the Lone Star Conference, and made the program's first appearance in the NCAA Division II playoffs. The first game against Chadron State ended in a Broncho victory. The Bronchos lost in the second round against UC Davis. The next season the Lone Star Conference underwent conference expansion, adding schools from Arkansas and Oklahoma, and split into two divisions. The first year of the new format the Bronchos captured the North Division title, and Howard won the North Division coach of the year award. In 1998 the Bronchos finished the regular season undefeated, and won their first Lone Star Conference Championship. However, in the NCAA playoffs the UCO lost in the second round to conference foe Texas A&M–Kingsville. In 2000 TAMU–K forfeited their entire 1998 season following NCAA infractions. In 1999 the Bronchos also won the Conference title. The final three years experienced a decline of a 5–5, 3–8, and 5–6 records. Howard was fired after the 2002 season. He finished with an overall record of 161–106–6.

Holland era (2008–2011)
In 2008, the Bronchos hired Tracy Holland as their head coach. In his first year as head coach the Bronchos had a 7–4 record and won the LSCs South Division Championship. However, the program's record declined every year under Holland. The decline in performance coincided with the NCAA's decision to place the Bronchos on three years probation for "lack of institutional control," starting in 2008 from infractions that occurred under Chuck Langston. As a result of penalties, UCO's roster was reduced from 100 players to 90 players each season during the probation. In December 2011, Holland was fired as head coach after compiling a 15–29 record during his four seasons at the helm. The following month, Nick Bobeck, a UCO alumnus and former fullback for the Bronchos, was hired to take the reins as head football coach at UCO.

Bobeck era (2012–2021)
With the Bronchos off probation from the NCAA, former UCO-fullback Nick Bobeck, took over as head coach in 2012. The 2012 campaign began with three straight losses before an upset win over top-ten ranked Washburn. The Bronchos finished with a 2–8 record. The following season the Bronchos began 0–7 before winning two straight. However, they lost to Northeastern State in the President's Cup game to finish with their second straight 2–8 record.  In the first game of the 2014 season, the Bronchos won their 600th game. At the time this placed UCO as the fourth highest win total in Division II history. During that season the Bronchos were as high as 22nd in the D2football.com rankings before finishing third in the MIAA with an 8–3 record and a Mineral Water Bowl appearance. In 2015, the Bronchos, began slowly with an 0–4 record, but won seven out of their final eight games to finish with a 7–5 record and a victory over in-state rival Southwestern Oklahoma State in the Live United Texarkana Bowl. In 2016 UCO finished with a 3–8 record. In 2017, the Bronchos began the season 2-4 with all four losses by seven points or less. UCO finished the regular season with five straight victories and a 7-4 record, and a tie for fourth in the MIAA. The Bronchos went on to win the inaugural Corsicana Bowl over Tarleton State 38–31.

Current coaching staff

Head coaches

The team has had 14 head coaches since organized football began in 1902. The Bronchos have played in more than 1,000 games in its 110 seasons. The current head coach is Adam Dorrel. In those seasons, three coaches have led the Bronchos to postseason playoff appearances: Al Blevins, Gary Howard and, Chuck Langston. Nick Bobeck has led the Bronchos to three Division II bowl games. Seven coaches have won conference championships with the Bronchos: Charles W. Wantland, Claude Reeds, Dale E. Hamilton, Gene Smith, Blevins, Phil Ball, and Howard. Blevins, and Howard have also won national championships with the Bronchos. Howard is the all-time leader in games coached and years coached, while Blevins is the all-time leader in wins and winning percentage. Tracy Holland is by December 2014, in terms of winning percentage, the least successful coach the Bronchos have had as head coach.

Of the 13 Bronchos coaches, Reeds has been inducted into the College Football Hall of Fame, albeit from his time as a player for the Oklahoma Sooners.

Conferences
From its inaugural season in 1902 until 1913, Central Oklahoma played as an independent program.  In 1914, it joined the Oklahoma Intercollegiate Conference (later renamed the Oklahoma Collegiate Conference) in which the school won 22 conference championships before leaving to play as an NAIA independent in 1976.  In 1988, it transferred to the Lone Star Conference in which it won two conference championships.  Central Oklahoma later joined the MIAA in 2012, after playing as an independent for one season.

Championships
 The following is a list of Central Oklahoma's 2 national championships.

National championship seasons

Conference championship seasons 
 The following is a list of Central Oklahoma's 27 conference championships.

Divisional championships 
The Lone Star Conference was split into two divisions from the 1997 to the 2010 season with Central Oklahoma competing in the LSC North. Central Oklahoma has won or shared 5 divisional titles. Their last division title was in the 2008 season. The conference and division championships were separate rankings.

Stadium

The Bronchos have played their home football games at Chad Richison Stadium, located on the north side of the UCO campus, since 1965. The current capacity is 10,000.  As of the end of the 2016 season, their current record at home stands at 168–97–5, a 62.9 winning percentage.

Rivalries

Northeastern State

Central Oklahoma and Northeastern State first played each other in 1912 and have since played in 77 contests with Central Oklahoma holding a 48–28–2 advantage. The two teams have combined for four NAIA national championships, and have played in two NCAA Division II conferences since 1997. Beginning in 1998 the two programs have competed for the President's Cup. Central Oklahoma currently leads 11–9 in the trophy series.

All-time record vs. current MIAA teams
Official record (including any NCAA imposed vacates and forfeits) against all current MIAA opponents as of the end of week ten of the 2017 NCAA Division II football season:

Postseason history
Central Oklahoma football teams have been invited to participate in 6 NAIA playoffs 4 NCAA Division II playoffs and 3 bowl games and have garnered a record of 12–9. Most recently, Central Oklahoma defeated the Tarleton State Texans in the Corsicana Bowl, 38–31, on December 2, 2017. Central Oklahoma's most recent playoff appearance was a 2003 Second round game against Texas A&M–Kingsville on November 29, 2003. They lost by a score of 49–6.

References

External links
 

 
American football teams established in 1902
1902 establishments in Oklahoma Territory